The next list is a list of the main cargo ports in Portugal, also including ports located in the Azores and Madeira islands. These ports are included in APP – Associação dos Portos de Portugal, a non-profit association with the objective of exchanging information and debates, contributing to the modernization of the national system of cargo ports. The ports are listed by TEU units capacity.

References 

Lists of ports